Hurlburt is an unincorporated community in Porter Township, Porter County, in the U.S. state of Indiana.

History
A post office was established at Hurlburt in 1883, and remained in operation until 1918. The community was named for a pioneer settler.

References

Unincorporated communities in Porter County, Indiana
Unincorporated communities in Indiana